Dastjerd (also known as Dostair) is a village in Dizmar-e Markazi Rural District, Kharvana District, Varzaqan County, East Azerbaijan Province, Iran. At the 2006 census, its population was 409, in 103 families.

References 

Towns and villages in Varzaqan County